The following is a list of indoor arenas in Poland, ordered by capacity. The venues are by their final capacity after construction for seating-only events.

Current arenas

See also
List of indoor arenas in Europe
List of indoor arenas by capacity

References

Indoor arenas in Poland
Poland
Indoor arenas